Sanger High School is a public high school located in the city of Sanger, Texas, in Denton County, United States and classified as a 4A school by the UIL.  It is a part of the Sanger Independent School District located in north central Denton County.   In 2015, the school was rated "Met Standard" by the Texas Education Agency.

The boundary of the school district, and therefore that of the high school, includes Sanger and portions of Denton.

Athletics
The Sanger Indians compete in these sports - 

Volleyball, Cross Country, Football, Basketball, Powerlifting, Golf, Tennis, Track, Baseball & Softball

State Titles
Softball - 
2001(3A)

Notable people
Dane Evans,  CFL quarterback

References

External links
 

Public high schools in Texas
High schools in Denton County, Texas